Pier Luigi Nervi (21 June 1891 – 9 January 1979) was an Italian engineer and architect. He studied at the University of Bologna graduating in 1913. Nervi taught as a professor of engineering at Rome University from 1946 to 1961 and is known worldwide as a structural engineer and architect and for his innovative use of reinforced concrete, especially with numerous notable thin shell structures worldwide.

Biography 
Nervi was born in Sondrio and attended the Civil Engineering School of Bologna from which he graduated in 1913; his formal education was quite similar to that experienced today by Italian civil engineering students.
After graduating he joined the Society for Concrete Construction and, during World War I from 1915 to 1918, he served in the Corps of Engineering of the Italian Army.  
From 1961 to 1962 he was the Norton professor at Harvard University.

Civil engineering works

Nervi began practicing civil engineering after 1923. His projects in the 1930s included several airplane hangars that were important for his development as an engineer. A set of hangars in Orvieto (1935) were built entirely out of reinforced concrete, and a second set in Orbetello and Torre del Lago (1939) improved the design by using a lighter roof, precast ribs, and a modular construction method.

During the 1940s he developed ideas for reinforced concrete which helped in the rebuilding of many buildings and factories throughout Western Europe, and even designed and created a boat hull that was made of reinforced concrete as a promotion for the Italian government.

Nervi also stressed that intuition should be used as much as mathematics in design, especially with thin shell structures. He borrowed from both Roman and Renaissance architecture while applying ribbing and vaulting to improve strength and eliminate columns. He combined simple geometry and prefabrication to innovate design solutions.

Engineer and architect
Nervi was educated and practised as an ingegnere edile (translated as "building engineer") – in Italy. At the time (and to a lesser degree also today), a building engineer might also be considered an architect. After 1932, his aesthetically pleasing designs were used for major projects. This was due to the booming number of construction projects at the time which used concrete and steel in Europe and the architecture aspect took a step back to the potential of engineering. Nervi successfully made reinforced concrete the main structural material of the day. Nervi expounded his ideas on building in four books (see below) and many learned papers.

Archeological excavations suggested that he may have some responsibilities for the Flaminio stadium foundations passing through ancient Roman tombs. His work was also part of the architecture event in the art competition at the 1936 Summer Olympics.

International projects
Most of his built structures are in his native Italy, but he also worked on projects abroad. Nervi's first project in the United States was the George Washington Bridge Bus Station, for which he designed the roof, which consists of triangular pieces that were cast in place. This building is still used today by over 700 buses and their passengers.

Noted works

 Stadio Artemio Franchi, Florence (1931)
 Ugolino Golf House, Impruneta, Italy (1934) (collaborating with Gherardo Bosio)
 Torino Esposizioni, Turin, Italy (1949).
 UNESCO headquarters, Paris (1950) (collaborating with Marcel Breuer and Bernard Zehrfuss)
 The Pirelli Tower, Milan (1950) (collaborating with Gio Ponti)
 Palazzo dello sport EUR (now PalaLottomatica), Rome (1956)
 Palazzetto dello sport, Rome (1958)
 Stadio Flaminio, Rome (1957)
 , Turin (1961)
 Palazzetto dello sport, Turin (1961)
Australia Square tower building, Sydney (1961 - 1967)
 Sacro Cuore (Bell Tower), Firenze (1962)
 Paper Mill, Mantua, Italy (1962)
 George Washington Bridge Bus Station, New York City (1963)
 Australia Square tower, Sydney (1964) Architect: Harry Seidler & Associates
 Tour de la Bourse, Montreal (1964) (collaborating with Luigi Moretti)
 Leverone Field House at Dartmouth College
 Sede Centrale della Banca del Monte di Parma, Parma (1968, collaboration with Giovanni Ponti, Antonio Fornaroli, and Alberto Rosselli)
 Edmund Barton Building (also published as Trade Group Offices), Canberra (1970), Australia. Architect Harry Seidler & Associates
MLC Centre, Sydney (1973) Architect: Harry Seidler & Associates 
 Thompson Arena at Dartmouth College (1973 - 1974)
 Cathedral of Saint Mary of the Assumption, San Francisco, California (1967) (collaborating with Pietro Belluschi)
 Paul VI Audience Hall, Vatican City (1971)
 Chrysler Hall, & Norfolk Scope Arena in Norfolk, Virginia (1971)
 Australian Embassy, Paris (1973) Consulting engineer. Architect. Harry Seidler & Associates
 Good Hope Centre, Cape Town (1976) by Studio Nervi, an exhibition hall and conference centre, with the exhibition hall comprising an arch with tie-beam on each of the four vertical facades and two diagonal arches supporting two intersecting barrel-like roofs which in turn were constructed from pre-cast concrete triangular coffers with in-situ concrete beams on the edges.

Awards
Pier Luigi Nervi was awarded Gold Medals by the Institution of Structural Engineers in the UK, the American Institute of Architects (AIA Gold Medal 1964)  and the RIBA.

In 1957, received the Frank P. Brown Medal of The Franklin Institute and the Wilhelm Exner Medal.

Publications
 Scienza o arte del costruire? Bussola, Rome, 1945.
 Costruire correttamente, Hoepli, Milan, 1954.
 Structures, Dodge, New York, 1958.
 Aesthetics and Technology in Building (The Charles Eliot Norton Lectures, 1961-62). Cambridge, Massachusetts, Harvard University Press, 1965.

See also
 Thin-shell structure

References

External links

 
 
 Ing. Nervi Pier Luigi. Fascismo - Architettura - Arte / Arte fascista web site
 Pierluigi Nervi e l'arte di costruire, Fausto Giovannardi, Borgo San Lorenzo (Florence) Italy 2008
 NerViLab at Sapienza University, Rome
 Pier Luigi Nervi Project
 http://www.silvanaeditoriale.it/catalogo/prodotto.asp?id=3015, catalogue to the international travelling exhibition "Pier Luigi Nervi Architecture as Challenge, edited by Cristiana Chiorino and Carlo Olmo, Milan, 2010

1891 births
1979 deaths
People from Sondrio
IStructE Gold Medal winners
Chartered designers
20th-century Italian architects
Italian civil engineers
Structural engineers
Modernist architects from Italy
Concrete shell structures
University of Bologna alumni
Harvard University faculty
Recipients of the Royal Gold Medal
Honorary Members of the Royal Academy
20th-century Italian engineers
Olympic competitors in art competitions
Italian military personnel of World War I
Recipients of the AIA Gold Medal
Honorary Fellows of the American Institute of Architects